Léon Parmentier (20 March 1901 – 21 October 1949) was a Belgian racing cyclist. He rode in the 1926 Tour de France.

References

1901 births
1949 deaths
Belgian male cyclists
Place of birth missing